Marcela Cristina Gómez (born 19 February 1984) is an Argentine long-distance runner. She competed in the women's marathon at the 2020 Summer Olympics held in Tokyo, Japan. In 2020, she competed in the women's half marathon at the World Athletics Half Marathon Championships held in Gdynia, Poland.

References

External links 
 

1984 births
Living people
Argentine female long-distance runners
Argentine female marathon runners
Athletes (track and field) at the 2020 Summer Olympics
Olympic athletes of Argentina
Olympic female marathon runners
People from Tres Isletas
Sportspeople from Chaco Province
21st-century Argentine women